In quantum field theory, the anomaly matching condition by Gerard 't Hooft states that the calculation of any chiral anomaly for the flavor symmetry must not depend on what scale is chosen for the calculation if it is done by using the degrees of freedom of the theory at some energy scale. It is also known as the  't Hooft condition and the  't Hooft UV-IR anomaly matching condition.

't Hooft anomalies
There are two closely related but different types of obstructions to formulating a quantum field theory that are both called anomalies: chiral, or Adler–Bell–Jackiw anomalies, and 't Hooft anomalies.

If we say that the symmetry of the theory has a 't Hooft anomaly, it means that the symmetry is exact as a global symmetry of the quantum theory, but there is some impediment to using it as a gauge in the theory.

As an example of a 't Hooft anomaly, we consider quantum chromodynamics with  massless fermions: This is the  gauge theory with  massless Dirac fermions. This theory has the global symmetry , which is often called the flavor symmetry, and this has a 't Hooft anomaly.

Anomaly matching for continuous symmetry 
The anomaly matching condition by G. 't Hooft proposes that a 't Hooft anomaly of continuous symmetry can be computed both in the high-energy and low-energy degrees of freedom (“UV” and “IR”) and give the same answer.

Example 
For example, consider the quantum chromodynamics with Nf massless quarks. This theory has the flavor symmetry  This flavor symmetry  becomes anomalous when the background gauge field is introduced. One may use either the degrees of freedom at the far low energy limit (far “IR” ) or the degrees of freedom at the far high energy limit (far “UV”) in order to calculate the anomaly. In the former case one should only consider massless fermions or Nambu–Goldstone bosons which may be composite particles, while in the latter case one should only consider the elementary fermions of the underlying short-distance theory. In both cases, the answer must be the same. Indeed, in the case of QCD, the chiral symmetry breaking occurs and the Wess–Zumino–Witten term for the Nambu–Goldstone bosons reproduces the anomaly.

Proof 
One proves this condition by the following procedure: we may add to the theory a gauge field which couples to the current related with this symmetry, as well as chiral fermions which couple only to this gauge field, and cancel the anomaly (so that the gauge symmetry will remain non-anomalous, as needed for consistency).

In the limit where the coupling constants we have added go to zero, one gets back to the original theory, plus the fermions we have added; the latter remain good degrees of freedom at every energy scale, as they are free fermions at this limit. The gauge symmetry anomaly can be computed at any energy scale, and must always be zero, so that the theory is consistent. One may now get the anomaly of the symmetry in the original theory by subtracting the free fermions we have added, and the result is independent of the energy scale.

Alternative proof 
Another way to prove the anomaly matching for continuous symmetries is to use the anomaly inflow mechanism. To be specific, we consider four-dimensional spacetime in the following.

For global continuous symmetries , we introduce the background gauge field  and compute the effective action . Wess–Zumino consistency condition shows that we can make it gauge invariant by adding the five-dimensional Chern–Simons action.

With the extra dimension, we can now define the effective action  by using the low-energy effective theory that only contains the massless degrees of freedom by integrating out massive fields. Since it must be again gauge invariant by adding the same five-dimensional Chern–Simons term, the 't Hooft anomaly does not change by integrating out massive degrees of freedom.

See also

't Hooft–Polyakov monopole
't Hooft loop
't Hooft symbol

Notes

References 

Anomalies (physics)
Quantum field theory